Luminita-Gabriela Trombitas  (born 5 July 1971) is a retired Romanian female volleyball player, who played as a setter. She was part of the Romania women's national volleyball team at the 2002 FIVB Volleyball Women's World Championship in Germany. On club level she played with Petrarca Padua.

Clubs
 Petrarca Padua (2002)

References

External links

1971 births
Living people
Romanian women's volleyball players
Place of birth missing (living people)